Allahu Akbar is an Islamic phrase, called Takbir in Arabic, meaning "Allah is greater" or "Allah is [the] greatest".

Allahu Akbar or Allahu Ekber and similar variants may also refer to:

 Allahu Akbar (anthem), the national anthem of Libya from 1969 to 2011
 Allahu Akbar (film), a 1977 Indian Malayalam film
 "Allahu Akbar" (Lounès Matoub song), a song written by Lounès Matoub
 Allahüekber Dağları, a range of mountains in northeast Turkey, formerly on the border between Turkey and Russia
 Allah-o Akbar Rural District, an administrative subdivision of Iran
 "Allah U Akbar", a song by Brand Nubian from their 1993 album In God We Trust

See also
Akbar (disambiguation)